Absentia is an American thriller drama television series that premiered on September 25, 2017, on Amazon Prime Video in the United States and AXN internationally. Directed by Oded Ruskin, the series stars Stana Katic, Matthew Le Nevez and Patrick Heusinger. The series was renewed for a second season, premiering on March 26, 2019, on AXN, and premiered in the United States on June 14, 2019. The third season premiered on July 17, 2020 exclusively on Amazon Prime Video. In May 2021, the series was cancelled after three seasons.

Premise
The series tells the story of FBI special agent Emily Byrne, who disappears without a trace while hunting one of Boston's most notorious serial killers, and she is declared dead in absentia. Six years later, she is found in a cabin in the woods, barely alive and with no memory of the years that she was missing. She returns home to learn that her husband has remarried and her son is being raised by the new wife, and she soon finds herself implicated in a new series of murders.

Cast and characters

Main
 Stana Katic as Special Agent Emily Byrne, a former FBI special agent who disappeared while hunting one of Boston's most notorious serial killers and was presumed dead, but returns six years later with no memory of her abduction. While struggling to rebuild her life and unravel the mystery of her disappearance, she becomes the prime suspect in a string of shocking new murders, and becomes a fugitive. Kalina Zaharieva plays a young Emily.
 Patrick Heusinger as Special Agent Nick Durand, Emily's husband and fellow FBI special agent who suffers with guilt that he stopped looking for Emily. He attempts to balance his life with Emily's return and his resurfacing feelings for her against his new marriage to Alice. After Emily goes on the run, his belief in her innocence crumbles and, after his family is endangered, relentlessly hunts her down.
 Cara Theobold as Alice Durand (seasons 1–2; guest season 3), Nick's new wife and Flynn's stepmother. Alice attempts to remain graceful and kind, but her behaviour towards Emily becomes increasingly harsh in the chaos after her return, believing she is a danger to Flynn and she is losing Nick's affection.
 Neil Jackson as Jack Byrne, Emily's older brother, a former surgeon who lost his job and medical license due to his alcohol addiction. In the first season he is a medical supply salesman. In the second season, after getting his medical license back, he starts working as an EMT and a paramedic working towards being reinstated as a medical doctor.
 Angel Bonanni as Detective Tommy Gibbs (seasons 1–2), an ambitious and relentless Boston Police detective in charge of investigating Emily for murder, who later teams up with Nick to hunt Emily down.
 Bruno Bichir as Dr. Daniel Vega (season 1), an FBI psychologist and profiler, who works with Emily to heal her psychological wounds and find her abductor.
 Paul Freeman as Warren Byrne, a retired Boston Police officer and Emily's adopted father.
 Ralph Ineson as Special Agent Adam Radford (season 1), the political and career-minded special agent in charge of the FBI's Boston field office, and Nick and Emily's boss. While he cares about Emily, he later coordinates a manhunt for her after she goes on the run.
 Christopher Colquhoun as Special Agent Derek Crown, an FBI special agent and colleague of Emily and Nick, who is later promoted to special agent in charge of the office after Radford's death. He is later demoted and replaced by Julianne Gunnarsen, but is re-promoted to the position near the end of the series after Gunnarsen is arrested for corruption and murder.
 Patrick McAuley as Flynn Durand, Emily's son with Nick, who has almost no memory of his mother and so is estranged and uncomfortable around her, although they gradually build a relationship.
 Matthew Le Nevez as Special Agent Cal Isaac (seasons 2–3), an FBI special agent and colleague of Emily and Nick, as well as a rugged former Navy SEAL, who becomes Emily's similarly haunted, loyal and empathetic counterpart.
 Natasha Little as Special Agent Julianne Gunnarsen (seasons 2–3), a new member of the Boston Field Office who is regarded as the FBI's best profiler, and joins the office after a lethal terrorist attack impacts Boston. She is later promoted to replace Crown as Special Agent in Charge of the office. She is eventually arrested near the end of the series for multiple acts of corruption, including Alice's murder, after her connection to an international crime ring is uncovered.

Recurring
 Lydia Leonard as Logan Brandt / Laurie Colson (season 1; guest season 2), a journalist investigating Emily.
 Richard Brake as Conrad Harlow (season 1), a reclusive wealthy banker and prime suspect in the serial killer case Emily was investigating before her disappearance. While the FBI was never able to make a case against Harlow as the serial killer, he is convicted of Emily's kidnapping and murder and sent to prison. Six years later, Emily's discovery results in his release.
 Hugh Quarshie as Dr. Semo Oduwale (season 2), Flynn's therapist and Alice's mentor.
 Geoff Bell as Colin Dawkins (season 3), a fixer working for an international crime syndicate to retrieve incriminating files by any means necessary.
 Josette Simon as Rowena Kincade (season 3), Emily's former FBI instructor.
Ross O'Hennessy as Armstrong (season 3), Cal Isaac's former unit leader in Afghanistan

Episodes

Season 1 (2017)

Season 2 (2019)

Season 3 (2020)

Production
Production was completed in Bulgaria on the ten-episode series, with every episode directed by Oded Ruskin. The entire first season was shot together, as though it were one long movie.

Release
The world premiere of Absentia was the opening selection at the 57th Monte Carlo Television Festival in June 2017. Absentia was a featured panel at Sony Pictures Television for the annual TV Market.

In Canada, Absentia was shown on Showcase in early 2018. In the United States, the series was picked up by Amazon and was released on Amazon Video on February 2, 2018. It was released on Amazon Video in the United Kingdom and Australia. The series was released in Sweden, Norway and Denmark on Viaplay December 5, 2017.

Reception
On review aggregator Rotten Tomatoes, the first season holds an approval rating of 47% based on 15 reviews, with an average rating of 5.78/10. The website's critical consensus reads, "Absentia sticks too closely to the procedural handbook, leaving its capable lead and mildly intriguing mystery treading water." On Metacritic, it has a weighted average score of 59 out of 100, based on the opinions of four critics, indicating "mixed or average reviews".

References

External links
 

2010s Bulgarian television series
2010s American crime drama television series
2010s American mystery television series
2020s Bulgarian television series
2020s American crime drama television series
2020s American mystery television series
2017 American television series debuts
2020 American television series endings
English-language television shows
Television series by Sony Pictures Television
Television shows set in Boston
Television shows set in Bulgaria